State Route 535 (SR 535) is an east–west state highway in the northeastern portion of the U.S. state of Ohio. The western terminus of State Route 535 is at a signalized intersection with State Route 283 in the northwestern portion of Painesville, and just north of State Route 283's interchange with State Route 2.

Created in the late 1930s, the route begins on a portion of Richmond Street which becomes High Street in Fairport Harbor; the route then follows East Street toward the north.  It then turns east onto Fairport Nursery Road, following that road all the way to its terminus at U.S. Route 20, which is just east of State Route 535’s interchange with State Route 2.

Route description
The entirety of State Route 535 exists in the Painesville vicinity in central Lake County.  The highway is not included as a part of the National Highway System a network of highways deemed most vital to the nation's economy, mobility and defense.

History
SR 535 was designated in 1937.  The highway maintains the same routing in the Painesville vicinity today that it had when it was first designated, and has not experienced any major changes.

Major intersections

References

535
Transportation in Lake County, Ohio